Suzette Lee (born 6 March 1977 in Houston, Texas) is a Jamaican triple jumper.

Career

Her personal best jump is 14.16 metres, achieved in April 2005 in Baton Rouge. She has an indoor mark of 14.25 metres, achieved in March 1997 in Indianapolis.

In July 2005 Lee was found guilty of salbutamol use at the EAA Karelia Games in Finland.  She received a public warning rather than a lengthy ban. Nonetheless, she has not competed internationally since 2005.

Achievements

References

External links

sports-reference

1975 births
Living people
Track and field athletes from Houston
Jamaican female triple jumpers
Athletes (track and field) at the 1994 Commonwealth Games
Athletes (track and field) at the 1995 Pan American Games
Athletes (track and field) at the 1996 Summer Olympics
Athletes (track and field) at the 1999 Pan American Games
Athletes (track and field) at the 2002 Commonwealth Games
Athletes (track and field) at the 2003 Pan American Games
Olympic athletes of Jamaica
Commonwealth Games competitors for Jamaica
Pan American Games silver medalists for Jamaica
LSU Lady Tigers track and field athletes
Doping cases in athletics
Jamaican sportspeople in doping cases
Pan American Games medalists in athletics (track and field)
Central American and Caribbean Games silver medalists for Jamaica
Central American and Caribbean Games bronze medalists for Jamaica
Competitors at the 1993 Central American and Caribbean Games
Competitors at the 1998 Central American and Caribbean Games
Central American and Caribbean Games medalists in athletics
Medalists at the 1999 Pan American Games
20th-century Jamaican women
21st-century Jamaican women